was a town located in Naga District, Wakayama Prefecture, Japan.

As of 2003, the town had an estimated population of 8,090 and a density of 156.33 persons per km2. The total area was 51.75 km2.

On November 11, 2005, Momoyama, along with the towns of Kishigawa, Kokawa, Naga and Uchita (all from Naga District), was merged to create the city of Kinokawa.

External links
Official town website 
Kinokawa city 

Dissolved municipalities of Wakayama Prefecture
Kinokawa, Wakayama